The Lotus Mark VI is the first production car by Lotus Cars. It was introduced by Colin Chapman in 1952 after previously building multiple trials and road racing cars. The heart of the Mark VI is a space frame chassis. Rather than a complete car, it was available to the general public as kit, wherein the customer could install any preferred engine and gearbox, making it eligible for a wider number of formulae.

Design
The Mark VI in many ways reflected Chapman's background in engineering: his designs resulted from a stress analysis of loads into the frame, they were extremely light (the 6' space frame weighed only 55 lbs (25 kg)), and the suspension incorporated the latest advances. The prototype chassis was built up by the Progress Chassis Company and the aluminium body was constructed by panel beaters Williams and Prichard. (Both firms would later furnish bodies and chassis for subsequent models.) The cheap and easily available mechanical parts were sourced from the Ford Prefect. The Mark VI became a common sight on Britain's racetracks and was a frequent winner, beating many more powerful and expensive cars; it earned praise for its handling and acceleration.

An important facet of the success of the kit was Chapman's offering a comprehensive package in the Mark VI, including most of the special parts needed, and not just the chassis. The Mark VI chassis came with mounting points for several different engines including the 1172 cc (71.5ci) Ford 10, the 1250 cc or 1500 cc MG TF, the 1500 cc (92 ci) Consul, and the exalted Coventry Climax. Standardized as far as possible for volume production, some units were customized per the owners wishes. Lotus even modified the owner's parts, if needed. The success of the Mark VI in competition and sales (100 built by 1955) established Chapman as a manufacturer of specialty cars.

Specifications
Number built: approximately 110
Weight:

Drivetrain
Engine: Ford E93A straight 4
Engine location: front, longitudinally mounted
Displacement: 1172 cc / 71.5 in³
Valvetrain: 2 valves per cylinder, sidevalve
Fuel feed: SU carburettors
Aspiration: naturally aspirated
Gearbox: Ford 3-speed manual
Drive: rear wheel drive

Performance
Power: 50 bhp / 37 kW at 5000 rpm
Torque: 77 Nm / 57 ft·lbf at 3000 rpm
BHP/litre: 43 bhp / litre (0.7 hp/ci)
Power-to-weight ratio: 0.12 bhp / kg
0-60 mph: 15.0 s
Top speed:

Notes

References
 William Taylor, The Lotus Book: The Complete History of Lotus Cars  Coterie Press, Limited.1998, pp. 20–21.

External links

Mark VI
Sports cars
Cars introduced in 1952